The Outlet Mound is an conical burial mound located at the outlet of Lake Monona - now near the junction of Midwood and Ridgewood Avenues in Monona, Wisconsin. It was added to the National Register of Historic Places in 2003.

History
The Outlet Mound is the sole surviving mound of what originally was a group of 19 conical, oval, and linear mounds at this site. Sixty feet around and seven feet high, it was the largest of that group. It was constructed as a Native American burial ground. One of the destroyed mounds in the group was radio-carbon dated to 50 BC; this mound is probably from that era. In 1944, it was saved from destruction and donated to the City of Monona.

References

Archaeological sites on the National Register of Historic Places in Wisconsin
Native American history of Wisconsin
National Register of Historic Places in Dane County, Wisconsin
Mounds in Wisconsin